The spot-breasted laughingthrush (Garrulax merulinus) is a species of bird in the family Leiothrichidae. It is found in Yunnan, Northeast India, Laos, Myanmar, north-west Thailand, and northern Vietnam. Its natural habitats are subtropical or tropical moist lowland forests and subtropical or tropical moist montane forests.

The orange-breasted laughingthrush (S. annamensis) of south-central Vietnam was formerly regarded as a subspecies of this bird but is now often treated as a separate species.

References

 Robson, Craig (2002) A Field Guide to the Birds of South-east Asia, New Holland, London.

spot-breasted laughingthrush
Birds of Northeast India
Birds of Myanmar
Birds of Yunnan
spot-breasted laughingthrush
spot-breasted laughingthrush
Taxonomy articles created by Polbot